Mutual may refer to:

Mutual organization, where as customers derive a right to profits and votes
Mutual information, the intersection of multiple information sets
Mutual insurance, where policyholders have certain "ownership" rights in the organization
Mutual fund, a professionally managed form of collective investments
Mutual Film, early American motion picture conglomerate, the producers of some of Charlie Chaplin's greatest comedies
Mutual Base Ball Club (1857-1871), defunct early baseball team usually referred to as "Mutual" in the standings.
Mutual Broadcasting System, a defunct U.S. radio network
Mutual Improvement Association, the name of two youth programs run by the Church of Jesus Christ of Latter-day Saints
Mutual authentication, used in cryptography
"Mutual", a 2018 song by Shawn Mendes from Shawn Mendes

Place names
Mutual, Maryland, a community in the United States
Mutual, Ohio, a village in the United States
Mutual, Oklahoma, a town in the United States
Mutual railway station in Cape Town, South Africa

See also
Mutualism
Reciprocal (disambiguation)